Jacob Seth Lugo (born November 17, 1989), nicknamed "Quarterrican", is an American professional baseball pitcher for the San Diego Padres of Major League Baseball (MLB). He has previously played in MLB for the New York Mets. Lugo made his MLB debut in 2016 with the Mets. He played for the Puerto Rican national baseball team in the 2017 World Baseball Classic winning a silver medal.

Career

Amateur career
Lugo attended Parkway High School in Bossier City, Louisiana, and Centenary College of Louisiana, where he played college baseball for the Centenary Gentlemen. In three seasons with Centenary, Lugo had a 5.31 earned run average (ERA).

Minor leagues
The New York Mets selected him in the 34th round, with the 1,032nd overall selection, of the 2011 MLB draft. He signed with the Mets, receiving a $20,000 signing bonus.

Lugo missed the 2012 season due to spondylolisthesis, which required spinal fusion surgery. After the procedure he was bedridden at his mother's home for three months. He returned to pitch in 2013 for the Brooklyn Cyclones of the Class A-Short Season New York–Penn League and the Savannah Sand Gnats of the Class A South Atlantic League, pitching to a 4–6 win–loss record with a 3.39 ERA in 12 games started. He pitched for the St. Lucie Mets of the Class A-Advanced Florida State League in 2014, and for the Binghamton Mets of the Class AA Eastern League and Las Vegas 51s of the Class AAA Pacific Coast League in 2015. The Mets added him to their 40-man roster after the 2015 season.

Lugo began the 2016 season with Las Vegas.

New York Mets
The Mets promoted Lugo to the major leagues on June 30. Lugo made his Major League debut against the Chicago Cubs on July 1, 2016, throwing two shutout innings in a victory. On August 25, Lugo recorded his first major league win and hit, throwing five shutout innings against the St. Louis Cardinals at Busch Stadium before exiting with muscle cramps. Following that, Lugo became a key cog in the Mets' injury-riddled rotation, pitching to a 2.67 ERA throughout the season and finishing with a 5–2 record. Lugo would have been the second or third starter for New York in the postseason had the Mets advanced past the Wild-Card Game.

Lugo chose to honor his paternal grandfather, who was Puerto Rican, by playing for the Puerto Rican national baseball team in the 2017 World Baseball Classic. He was the starting pitcher against Venezuela in the first round and against United States in both the second round and the Championship Game. He won both the first and second-round games. In the Championship Game, Lugo did not have the same luck on the mound as Puerto Rico lost, 8–0.

Entering the 2017 season, Lugo was expected to provide depth the Mets' pitching staff. After injuries to other starters, Lugo found himself battling with Robert Gsellman for the final spot in the Opening Day starting rotation. However, Lugo himself would be diagnosed with a partial tear of the ulnar collateral ligament in his pitching arm after competing for Puerto Rico in the 2017 World Baseball Classic. The injury would cause him to miss the first two months of the regular season. He returned to make his first start of the season for the Mets on June 11, 2017 against the Atlanta Braves, getting the win after pitching seven innings of one-run ball. On Saturday July 15, 2017 Lugo hit his first major league home run against the Colorado Rockies. On August 15, Lugo was again placed on the disabled list with an impingement in his pitching shoulder. He returned on August 27, pitching  innings with 5 strikeouts in a pitch-limited start. He continued making shorter starts throughout September, finishing the season with a 7-5 record and an ERA of 4.71, with 85 strikeouts and 25 walks over  innings pitched.

Lugo performed very well the following season, posting a 2.66 ERA and 103 strikeouts in 54 games. He was once again effective in 2019, his first season in which he was exclusively a relief pitcher, posting a 2.70 ERA while striking out 104 batters and walking only 16 in 80 innings. Lugo struggled during the 2020 season, registering a 5.15 ERA and 3-4 record with 47 strikeouts in 36.2 innings of work.

On May 17, 2021, Lugo was placed on the 60-day injured list after undergoing right elbow surgery. He was activated on May 31.

On April 29, 2022, Lugo pitched in relief in a combined no-hitter against the Philadelphia Phillies, pitching  of an inning.

San Diego Padres
On December 22, 2022, Lugo signed a one-year contract with the San Diego Padres, containing a player option for the 2024 season.

Personal life
Lugo and Amanda Vogle married in January 2018. He is the son of Vicki and Ben Lugo.

Seth was the punter for his high school football team, goalkeeper for soccer team, and a high jumper in track and field.

References

External links

1989 births
Living people
People from Shreveport, Louisiana
Baseball players from Louisiana
Major League Baseball pitchers
New York Mets players
American sportspeople of Puerto Rican descent
Centenary Gentlemen baseball players
Kingsport Mets players
Brooklyn Cyclones players
Savannah Sand Gnats players
St. Lucie Mets players
Binghamton Mets players
Las Vegas 51s players
2017 World Baseball Classic players
Binghamton Rumble Ponies players
Syracuse Mets players